(1 February 1905 – 8 July 1974) was a Japanese communist. He was born in 1905 in Shimonoseki. In 1928, he joined the Japanese Communist Party.

On 1 May 1941, he was arrested as the leader of the Communist Party Rebuilding Committee. He was imprisoned in Sugamo prison where he met Hotsumi Ozaki.

Kamiyama remained in jail until 1945. After the war, he was active in the Japanese Communist Party.

See also
 Japanese dissidence during the Shōwa period

References

External links

1905 births
1974 deaths
People from Shimonoseki
Japanese communists